Kadodi, Samavedi is the language spoken by the Samvedi Brahmin and Kupari community in Vasai, Maharashtra, India.

See also
List of Kadodi words  and Kadodi to Marathi  word meanings

References

Southern Indo-Aryan languages
Culture of Maharashtra
Konkani languages